This is a list of Grand Prix and other major automobile races in Germany.
Grand Prix of Germany
European Grand Prix
Rallye Deutschland
6 Hours of Nürburgring
Nürburgring 24 Hours

 
Germany